Kim Seo-yeong (born March 17, 1994, in Suwon) is a South Korean swimmer, who specialized in individual medley events. Kim broke a South Korean record of 2:13.65 to take the bronze medal in the 200 m individual medley at the 2009 East Asian Games in Hong Kong.

Kim qualified for the women's 400 m individual medley at the 2012 Summer Olympics in London, by clearing a FINA B-standard entry time of 4:46.56 from the Dong-A Swimming Championships in Ulsan. She topped the second heat by nearly two seconds ahead of seven other swimmers, including former bronze medalists Sara Nordenstam of Norway and four-time Olympian Georgina Bardach of Argentina, breaking her personal best of 4:43.99. Kim's overwhelming triumph was not enough to advance her into the final, as she placed seventeenth overall in the preliminary heats. She plans on competing in the 2020 Tokyo Olympics.

In July 2021, she represented South Korea at the 2020 Summer Olympics held in Tokyo, Japan. She competed in the women's 200 metre individual medley and 4 × 200 metre freestyle relay events. In the freestyle event, she advanced to semifinal however missed out to compete in the final. In the freestyle relay event, the team did not advance to compete in the final.

References

External links
 NBC Olympics Profile
 

1994 births
Living people
South Korean female freestyle swimmers
South Korean female medley swimmers
Olympic swimmers of South Korea
Swimmers at the 2012 Summer Olympics
Swimmers at the 2016 Summer Olympics
Female medley swimmers
Sportspeople from Gyeonggi Province
Swimmers at the 2014 Asian Games
Swimmers at the 2018 Asian Games
Asian Games medalists in swimming
Asian Games gold medalists for South Korea
Asian Games silver medalists for South Korea
Medalists at the 2018 Asian Games
Universiade medalists in swimming
Universiade bronze medalists for South Korea
Medalists at the 2017 Summer Universiade
Swimmers at the 2020 Summer Olympics
21st-century South Korean women